Each section in Shah Alam has a theme in naming the names of the streets that are available in the section. Here is a list of sections and each theme.

List
Section 1 (Universiti Teknologi MARA) - education
Section 2  - Types of flowers
Section 3  - Types of trees
Section 4  - Types of fruits
Section 5  - (Selangor State Administrative Centre) - administration
Section 6  - Types of birds
Section 7  - (University Of Selangor campus (education) / i-City) - Types of gems and minerals
Section 8  - The landform
Section 9  - Malay Selangor Sultanate
Section 10 - The type of clothing
Section 11 - Culture and arts
Section 12 - Malay government pedigree ago
Section 13 - Types Of Sport
Section 14 (City Centre) - the areas of corporate
Section 15 - Hand tools
Section 16 - Hand tools and herbs
Section 17 - The type of fish
Section 18 - Plants in coastal areas
Section 19 - Type of employment in coastal areas
Section 20 - Types of animals
Section 21 (Cemeteries) - graveyard
Section 22 - The enterprise
Section 23 - The enterprise
Section 24 - Types of vegetables
Section 25 (Taman Sri Muda) - values
Section 26 - The district and the name of the place in Selangor
Sections 27 and 28 (Taman Alam Megah) - The district and the name of the place in Selangor
Sections 29 and 30 (Jalan Kebun) - Name of the leaders of the roads in Jalan Kebun (Ketua Lorong)
Section 31 (Kota Kemuning) - Official flower orchid in Shah Alam
Section 32 (Bukit Rimau)   -  Rivers in Selangor
Section 33 - Types of musical instruments
Section 34 - The car parts
Section 35 (Alam Impian) - Ancient figures
Section 36 - Traditional kueh
Section U1 (Glenmarie) - Career
Section U2 (Taman TTDI Jaya) - Literature
Section U3 (Sultan Salahuddin Abdul Aziz Shah Airport, Taman Subang Perdana)
Section U4 (Kwasa Sentral, Kwasa Damansara and Sungai Buloh MRT Depot)
Section U5 (Bandar Pinggiran Subang, Subang Pelangi, Subang Mahsing) -  Universe
Section U6 (Subang) - Type of tree
Section U7 (RMAF/TUDM) - Telecommunication
Section U8 (Bukit Jelutong) - The parts of the house
Section U9 (Sunway Kayangan) - Colours
Section U10 (Alam Budiman & Puncak Perdana) - Islands in Selangor
Section U11 (Bukit Bandaraya) - there are mountains in Selangor
Section U12 (Desa Alam & Cahaya Alam) - Type of herbal plants
Section U13 (Setia Alam) - Setia
Section U14 (Greenhill Residence, Alam Budiman)
Section U15 (Puncak Alam)
Section U16 (Taman Bukit Subang, City of Elmina, Denai Alam) - Science and Biological Terms 
Section U17 (Aman Putri)
Section U18 (Paya Jaras)
Section U19 (Paya Jaras / Kampung Baru Sungai Buloh)
Section U20 (Bandar Baru Sungai Buloh, Kelab Rahman Putra Malaysia, Bukit Rahman Putra Section 1 - 6)

All roads in the city has a street name sign is displayed in English with the two characters of Rumi and Jawi.

Shah Alam